Thor Furulund (né Thore Furulund; 12 June 1943 – 16 January 2016) was a Norwegian painter.

He was born in Oslo and resided in Bærum.

Furulund was educated at Beckman Skola in Stockholm, and is represented with his art works  at Riksgalleriet and at the Royal Palace in Oslo.

His work has been purchased, among other places, by the National Gallery in Norway, the Bærum municipality and the Royal Palace in Norway.

Exhibits

1980 Young Artists' Society, Oslo 
1981 Gallery Haaken, Oslo 
1986 Gallery Haaken, Oslo 
1997 Gallery Haaken, Oslo 
2000 Gallery Haaken, Oslo 
2003 Gallery Haaken, Oslo 
2006 Gallery Haaken, Oslo

References

1943 births
2016 deaths
Artists from Oslo
Norwegian expatriates in Sweden
20th-century Norwegian painters
21st-century Norwegian painters
Norwegian male painters
20th-century Norwegian male artists
21st-century Norwegian male artists